Yuri Dmytrovych Velykanovych (ukr. Ю́рій Дми́трович Великано́вич; 1910, Turka, Galicia, Austria-Hungary, September 7, 1938, Ebro Valley, Spanish Republic) was a participant in the Spanish Civil War, Ukrainian interbrigadist, member of the Communist Party of Western Ukraine (CPWU).

Biography 
Yuri Velykanovych was born in a family of teachers Emilia and Dmytro Velykanovych in the village of Ilnyk (Austria-Hungary, nowadays Stryi Raion, Lviv Oblast, Ukraine) where he graduated from school. Since 1920 he studied in the Ukrainian grammar school in Lviv. Then he entered the Faculty of Philology at the Jan Kazimierz University (nowadays Ivan Franko National University of Lviv). Being a student he joined the Communist Party of Western Ukraine.

Since the summer of 1936, he is a fighter of the International Brigades in Spain during the Civil War.

Since July 1937, he is a member of the Company named after Taras Shevchenko (a part of the XIII Dabrowski Brigade) composed of Ukrainian communists from Galicia and Volhynia. In the interbrigadist press Velykanovych publishes his articles and correspondence in Polish, Spanish and Ukrainian about Taras Shevchenko's life and creativity, about the battle way of the company ("Taras Shevchenko", "The Ukrainians in the International Brigades", "Taras Shevchenko in the Aragon Front" and others).

On September 4, 1938, he was mortally wounded in the battle of the Ebro river.

Homage 

During the Soviet era, in 1982, a monument to Yuri Velykanovych was erected in Lviv. In addition a street received the name of Velykanovych (renamed by the authorities in 1991 after gaining independence). On that street there was a school with deep learning of Spanish.

In May 2015, the vandals cut off the head of the statue. The monument was dismantled for restoration, and then returned to its place.

At night on December 2, 2017, members of the neo-Nazi group C14 threw the sculpture to the ground, drew the slogan "Down with the communist!" on the pedestal, and left the signature of their gang.

External links 
 Anger as statue of Spanish civil war hero vandalised - the International Brigade Memorial Trust (IBMT) has condemned the desecration of a monument to a Ukrainian who died in the Spanish (Morning Star)

References 

1910 births
1938 deaths
People from Lviv Oblast
Ukrainian Austro-Hungarians
People from the Kingdom of Galicia and Lodomeria
Communist Party of Western Ukraine members
Ukrainian revolutionaries
Anti-fascists
International Brigades personnel
People of the Spanish Civil War
Foreign volunteers in the Spanish Civil War
Military personnel killed in the Spanish Civil War